Sly 2: Band of Thieves is a platform stealth video game developed by Sucker Punch Productions and published by Sony Computer Entertainment. It was released in 2004 for PlayStation 2. It is the sequel to the game Sly Cooper and the Thievius Raccoonus and part of the Sly Cooper video game series. The game received critical acclaim and is often considered to be one of the greatest PlayStation 2 games of all time.

Sly 2: Band of Thieves has a variety of changes, particularly in level design. The ultimate goal is to acquire Clockwerk parts, one or more of which can be found per world. Sly 2 features a health meter for characters such as Sly, Bentley and Murray, replacing the "charm system" of the first game. It also takes several attacks to defeat guards. Other changes include missions where the player controls Bentley or Murray, who have their own unique skills and are able to do much more than in the previous game. However, Sly remains the main character despite these changes to character roles. Skills can be unlocked by opening safes in each world, as the previous game allowed (collecting clue bottles), but skills may also be acquired by collecting coins and purchasing them from safehouses via Thiefnet.

Gameplay

Premise 
Like its predecessor, Sly 2: Band of Thieves is a stealth platform action-adventure video game. It follows the Cooper Gang, raccoon Sly Cooper, turtle Bently, and hippo Murray, who try to collect the pieces of the robot owl that was destroyed in the first game, Clockwerk. They have been stolen from the Interpol police department by Klaww Gang, its members using them for illegal get-rich-quick schemes. 

The player simultaneously acts as three characters (Sly, Murray, and Bentley) where, in each open world, they pull of several small character-specific heists that build into one large heist. The gameplay is also freeform, where the player can perform other activities, such as looting from guards, from the mission currently assigned. This differs from the first game, where the player only controls Sly to get to the end of each level. Many heists only require one character, but some are collaborations. Examples including Bentley jumping into Murray's arms in order to be thrown onto a tower's ledge, or Sly stealing keys from a truck for Bently to drive.

Interpol's Carmelita Montaya Fox continues trying to catch the Cooper gang while being infatuated with Sly; similar to the previous game, Sly 2: Ban of Thieves opens with her chasing Sly. She is now assisted by Constable Neyla, who grew up poor in New Delhi before using persuasion skills to enter and garner high grades  at a British university; Interpol recently hired her to use them for infiltration into criminal institutions. The Contessa, a leading prison warden and criminal psychologist, has also been hired by the police department for her hypnotherapy techniques, which have been successful in deincentivizing criminal behavior.

Sly 2: Band of Thieves is double the length of its predecessor, lasting eight stages and five worlds. Each world has a Klaww Gang member leading a criminal organization or family within it as its boss. Dimitri is a celebrity in the underworld of Paris, forging popular paintings in revenge to classmates that criticized his works done at his art college. Jean-Bistro is in Canada extracting natural resources, such as chopping down trees, to tame "the Wild North". He utilizes a train system spanning across the nation's plains to import goods for the Klaww Gang. He had previously been frozen for 100 years as a result of an avalanche he faced while taking opportunity of the Klondike Gold Rush, thus alienating him from society. Rajan, born poor in India, has committed to a life of crime throughout his whole life, such as working for the gang, in order to increase his standing in the nation's social hierarchy. The parrot Arpeggio, who frequently attends opera houses in London, is inspired by his inability to fly to develop his skills as a mechanic, and serves that role for the gane. In Prague is the Contessa's criminal rehabilitation center.

New elements 
Several new gameplay elements are introduced. Guards now pop out at random moments, and execute one of two types of behavior depending on the geometry of the part of the level they are standing on. They also have more advanced artificial intelligence, being able to climb up pipes, meaning Sly can still be hit by them even when already on a rooftop. Additionally, the guards do not catch the player character simply by seeing them, but rather if a display on the screen and sound cue indicates it. Enemies include the boars in Paris, and elephants in India.

Sly, Bentley and Murray have different abilities that the tasks required utilization of one or more of. Bentley follows a more cloak and dagger approach to stealth. He can't climb poles or jump very far, but he is equipped with a sleep-dart crossbow and countdown bombs to defeat enemies or sabotage enemy equipment. Bentley can use his computer skills to hack villains' computers, bringing the player to a top-down shooter-like mini-game. Murray is much more direct. His brute strength allows him to take on groups of strong enemies by himself with powerful hooks and uppercuts. He can pick up objects and enemies to throw and his "thunder flop" attack can stun and destroy enemies. His strength allows him to help the gang with heavy-duty tasks.

Unlike the first game, where a life is lost if Sly was noticed by a guard or injured once, Sly 2: Band of Thieves provides the playable character multiple hit points. Each character has a health bar and a special bar. Health is diminished every time the character is attacked or hits a hazard. If it is depleted entirely, the player must restart any current mission and respawn at another location. The orange special bar depletes whenever a character uses a powerup. If the special bar hits zero, powerups can not be used. Some powerups are required in order to complete certain missions. Both bars (health and special) can be refilled by obtaining health pickups that are in the shape of a red cross, which are found behind destructible objects like boxes and tables. Murray has the most health, while Bentley has the least.

Missions are now connected to a main hub of the location Sly and the Gang are operating. A safehouse located in the hub is where the player can choose which character to use and get away from pursuing guards. The hub can range from a city to a lumber camp in the wilderness. Enemies do patrol around this area, although on occasion, it's a secluded spot. Characters can explore the hub world freely, or begin a mission at certain locations. Sly detects the points at which a new heist begins with an interactive mask.

Sly has new moves when it comes to stealth, such as sneaking behind two enemies to kill them in one combo move that involves a throw, and pickpocketing. When Sly sneaks up behind an enemy, he can reach out with his cane and grab coins, rubies, rings, diamonds, and other valuable objects out of the enemy's pocket. Once Sly gets all of their coins, he can grab the enemy's item and sell it later back at the safehouse for a bunch of coins.

Most powerups and extra moves are now bought from the safehouse instead of being found in safes. Using collected coins, Sly can buy powerups for each character from an in-game online store, Thiefnet. The store has smoke grenades that cost 300 coins, and the new moves cost more than 1,000. Sly's powerups focus on stealth, Murray's powerups on brawn, and Bentley's power-ups on technology. Some of Sly's new moves are one that costs 1,600 coins giving him the ability to move past traps and slowly sneak him enemies. Power-ups for Bentley include a hover pack that allows him to fly and an adrenaline rush that increases his wheelchair speed. For Bentley, there are explosives for his jump attacks. Most powerups need to be assigned to a button, but some provide passive bonuses. Characters can unlock special upgrades by opening safes. To open a safe, the characters must determine the code to unlock it by collecting all the clue bottles hidden in the present hub world. Certain very valuable items can be found in the world and can be stolen and then sold at the safe house for a large amount of money; these valuables can range from portraits to vases.

The game makes use for the optional USB microphone for the player to use the sound of their voice to distract and attract in-game enemies. This, in turn, adds a new twist to the stealth elements, as the player has to refrain from noises such as talking or coughing to avoid creating in-game noise.

Development

Production and design 
Sly 2: Band of Thieves was developed by the company responsible for the predecessor, Sucker Punch Productions. The Seattle-based developer's Brian Fleming and Elodie Hummel produced the project, Darren Rice credited as assistant producer. At Sony Computer Entertainment America, Grady Hunt was senior producer, and Greg Philips and Sam Thompson were associate producers. Nate Fox served as lead designer, working alongside Rob McDaniel, Dev Madan, Caroline Trujillo, Tom Mabe, and Keith Champagne; Fox was also dialogue and story writer. Programmers were Chris Zimmerman, Chris Bentzel, Dan Brakeley, Chris Heidorn, Steve Johnson, Bruce Oberg, Matthew Scott, and Sean Smith. 

The entire process was guided by a sentence that producer Brian Fleming wrote a month in: "Sly and the gang work together to pull off a string of big heists." Tenchu: Stealth Assassins (1998) was referenced for creating the stealth gameplay. Like all of Sucker Punch's previous games, such as the first Sly Cooper entry and Rocket: Robot on Wheels (1999), the target demographic was all ages, with the upbeat nature for younger gamers and gameplay concepts and humour for older and hardcore players. Also similar to the developer's previous projects, the designers and artists went for jungle gym-esque stages, focusing on interactivity over simply giving the player obstacles. For the scenarios, Fox wanted the player to fell like they were in a heist film, "like you're watching from the shadows, like you're empowered to do things and have no one know that you're doing them." 

The goal from the beginning was to expand on the first entry's gameplay elements, concepts, and locations, and its engine was rewritten to accompany this. One method of enhancing the gameplay was the incorporation of non-linear gameplay assets, such as the freedom to enter and complete areas in any order and variable paths for characters in missions. Explained Fox, this was so the player felt like they were in control of the whole experience instead of just the character, similar to Deus Ex (1998). Some trial and error was involved in conceiving level geometry from adjusting to the variables of the guards. Artificial intelligence of enemies were also improved for the experience of completing a game differing from session-to-session.

Visuals and worlds 

Lead artist was Madan, overseeing concept art, cutscenes and character designs. Suzanne Kaufman was 3D animator, Andrew Woods character animator, and Karin Yamagiwa texture artist. Other members of the art team included Travis Kotzebue, Paul Whitehead, Hokyo Lim, Ramey Harris, Augie Pagan, Edward Pun, and Joanna Wang, with Kathy Anderson, Logan Bender, Jordan Kotzebue, Dan Phillips, Shane White, and Scott Wiener credited as additional artists.

The look and style was inspired by Batman: The Animated Series (1992–1995), Fox noting its film noir look combined with tongue-in-cheek humor. It also was influenced by comic books and various 1970s Saturday morning cartoons. Madan explained the goal was to make an interactive cartoon, where Sly "pop[ed]" out of the screen when he jumped. This was accomplished by having the most detailed assets the farthest away and in the background, and the simplest and most "abstract", as well as the flat-looking characters, in the front, per the cartoon shows they referenced. 

Usual at Sucker Punch, the visual-making process was the greenlighting of ideas from concept artists, then designers using it to figure out the geometry and placement of characters and objects in levels, then concept artists filling in the details; this was all before modeling, texturing, and lighting. For Sly 2: Band of Thieves, the concept art production started with Madan coming up with bosses, as they would dictate the feel of the levels, before the entire art staff conceived locations to base them on. For antagonists, artists decided on drawing two types, serious and comedic, and had their proportions as asymmetrical as possible so they were identifiable from a distance. 

Using photographs of the real-life locations, the first concept drawings for settings focused on the types of shapes, space, and height of buildings and architecture. At least one drawing was made per world, and two if it had that many areas, such as India which has a cave and market. What followed was drawings of the same levels with actual assets, such as decorations, bridges, columns, doors, roofs and the like. At this stage, the artists attempted to achieve the most personality in as few drawings as possible. The levels were then modeled in Maya. First, basic shapes were placed for the designers to test the stages for interactivity and feeling of movement, tweaks done from these experiences. Then, modelers came in to fully shape the assets into what they became in the final product.

The goal was to make the environments immersive and pretty to view, "but never more important than Sly." The incorporation of far-away massive noticeable architecture that direct the player, such as the Eiffel Tower, was inspired by Disneyland's "weenies", such as Sleeping Beauty Castle and Space Mountain, that served the same purpose. This concept meant camera views were figured out during concept drawing of the locations. Fox also explained the pathways were inspired by Y-intersection-filled road paths common in European countries, where due to not being able to see what is ahead, the driver notices a new plaza or building by surprise. The artists also made sure to not overstuff the stages, so that the overall look was not absent of the series' stylization and filled with Moiré pattern.

Audio 
Bill Wolford was the game's sound designer. Peter McConnell composed the music and performed strings and hand percussion, along with Michael Olmos performing trumpet and Jerome Rossen accordion. Laurie Bauman produced the voice acting and wrote the dialog with the help of Carrie Palk, David Howe, and Wendi Willis, who voiced the "bad animals" in the game. Kevin Miller, Matt Olsen, and Chris Murphy reprise their roles as Sly Cooper, Murray and Bently respectively, with newcomers Alisa Glidewell as Carmelita and Neyla, David Scully as Dimitri and Rajan, Gloria Manon as Contessa, Ross Douglas as Jean-Bison, and Sam Mowry as Arpeggio.

Release 
In North America and Europe, Sly 2: Band of Thieves was one of three games Sony Computer Entertainment published as part of the 2004 holiday, others being Ratchet & Clank: Up Your Arsenal and Jak 3.

==Reception==

The game received critical acclaim from numerous publications. Metacritic gave it 88 out of 100. It received a runner-up position in GameSpot's 2004 "Best Platformer" award category across all platforms, losing to Ratchet & Clank: Up Your Arsenal.

Jörg Luibl of 4Players enjoyed the game's "quiet, acrobatic elegance that is second to none" to other platform games that were generally more noisy in personality, such as the third Ratchet and Clank game. He called the level design the best he had seen in a while, and appreciated the freedom of choice, where you "have your goal in mind without dead ends. You can let off steam in the city as you wish, change characters, buy items and also go on a treasure hunt away from the story."

The control was praised, called by Bro Buzz of GamePro one of the most user-friendly setups in gaming.

The storytelling and humor were highly thought of by reviewers, who noted the charm and twists and described the experience as interactivity with a cartoon, specifically a Cartoon Network show or animated film. However, Luibl thought that the dialog that the previous entry's "funny coolness and liveliness," and was critical towards the German subtitles and dubbing, such as spelling errors and lack of disparity between voice actors.

The graphics were acclaimed, particularly the cel shading. Luibl called them better than the predecessor, citing examples of the "wonderfully lively" environments such as fog, lanterns lit up in the dark, and the "fairy tale" look of India. The character animation and design was well-received. Luibl in addition to the enemies, cited Sly Cooper, particularly his prancing, whirling jumps, and squatting animation. Luibl compared the music to Grim Fandango (1998), which was also composed by McConnell. 

Luibl reported Sly 2: Band of Thieves taking 15–20 hours to beat. He found the game easy, praising its subtle rise in difficulty and being free of the trial and error and prolonged wandering of Jak II (2003) thanks to the save system and pointers indicating where heists begin.

The camera was the most critique'd aspect. Bro Buzz disliked the absence of an instant centering of the view around Sly, resulting in him being obscured during altercations with enemies. He also reported the camera sometimes getting stuck on collision and not catching up to the player character. Luibl wrote that when Sly jumps down, walls block the view.

Luibl criticized many of the heists as linear and sometimes involving performing the same actions as prior heists. He explained that this was the most prevalent in Bentley's heists, which frequently involving taking pictures and hacking into computers. For him, this negatively affected the replay value, which was only contributed via the game's 30 secret bottles.

Legacy 
Sly 2: Band of Thieves frequently appears on all-time lists of PlayStation 2 games, ranking number 23 by GameSpy and SVG.com, number 24 by IGN, and appearing on unranked features by Digital Trends, and VG247. Sportskeeda ranked it the fifth best all-time 3D platformer. Sly 2: Band of Thieves is generally considered by critics to be the best Sly Cooper game, a successful expansion of the qualities of the first game, its most highlighted aspects being the inclusion of three playable characters with distinct abilities and the variety and captivity of the worlds. Jesse Lab, writing for The Escapist in 2022, argued the series maintained its true identity by the second game, moving past the rigid platforming tropes, such as simply getting to the end of the level, for open world gameplay with various missions and task to complete.

It is also considered unique from most other video games, particularly stealth and platformer games, for its Saturday morning cartoon nature, humor, lighthearted-ness, and caper-centric gameplay. IGNs PlayStation 2 ranking, one of the features hold this opinion, already celebrating the series for its distinct combination of family-friendliness with stealth and "genuinely funny" comedy. Gameplay centered around scenarios similar to those in heist films, like Ocean's 11 (1960) and The Italian Job (1969), are commonplace in realistic open world crime video games, most notably the Grand Theft Auto series (1997–present), but rare in cartoon platformers. Commemorated USgamers Jeremy Parish, it is a rare heist video game to successfully balance requirements and liberty when it came to heists. They are required to be completed to progress to others, but the player had control over how to do so.

Sly 2: Band of Thieves was followed by Sly 3: Honor Among Thieves (2005) developed by Sucker Punch, and Sly Cooper: Thieves in Time (2013), which was developed by Sanzaru Games with influence from Band of Thieves.

Notes

References

External links

Official website

2004 video games
3D platform games
Stealth video games
PlayStation 2 games
PlayStation 2-only games
Single-player video games
Interactive Achievement Award winners
Sly Cooper
Video games about raccoons
Video games with cel-shaded animation
Video games set in Egypt
Video games set in Paris
Video games set in India
Video games set in Canada
Video games set in the Czech Republic
Video games scored by Peter McConnell
Video games developed in the United States
Works set in Prague